Petermann Fjord is a fjord in northwestern Greenland. Administratively it marks the boundary between the Avannaata municipality and the Northeast Greenland National Park.

The fjord and its glacier are named after German cartographer August Heinrich Petermann.

Knud Rasmussen described the fjord entrance in the following terms:

Geography
Petermann Fjord stretches roughly from southeast to northwest for about 110 km. Its mouth opens in the Kennedy Channel and Hall Basin area, between Cape Lucie Marie, located east of Cape Morton, and Cape Tyson in the north, near Offley Island. It is a long and broad fjord lined with precipitous cliffs topped by glaciated plateaux. The Petermann Glacier, the longest glacier in Greenland, discharges into the fjord from the Greenland Ice Sheet, located further 80 km inland.

This fjord is located northeast of Daugaard-Jensen Land, between the Petermann Peninsula and Hall Land.

Bibliography
H.P. Trettin (ed.), Geology of the Innuitian Orogen and Arctic Platform of Canada and Greenland. Geological Survey of Canada (1991) 
Ocean circulation and properties in Petermann Fjord, Greenland
Multibeam bathymetry from the Petermann Fjord and adjacent Hall Basin, Northwest Greenland

See also
List of fjords of Greenland

References

External links

Icy Seas - Petermann Fjord
Petermann Fjord: a Glacier & Climate History

Fjords of Greenland